Corporal Charles W. Dolloff (May 10, 1844 to August 2, 1884) was an American soldier who fought in the American Civil War. Dolloff received the country's highest award for bravery during combat, the Medal of Honor, for his action during the Third Battle of Petersburg in Virginia on 2 April 1865. He was honored with the award on 24 April 1865.

Biography
Dolloff was born in Parishville, New York on 10 May 1844. He enlisted into the 1st Vermont Infantry. He died on 2 August 1884 and his remains are interred at the Forest Cemetery in Wisconsin.

Medal of Honor citation

See also

List of American Civil War Medal of Honor recipients: A–F

References

1844 births
1884 deaths
People of Vermont in the American Civil War
People of New York (state) in the American Civil War
Union Army officers
United States Army Medal of Honor recipients
American Civil War recipients of the Medal of Honor